Rivière-Pilote (or ) is a town and commune in the French overseas department of Martinique.

The village is situated on the southern end of Martinique, between the village of Sainte-Luce and the town of Le Marin which is a popular haven for yachts.  Rivière-Pilote lies inland on the River Grande Pilote which drains the southern slopes of the mountainous Parc Naturel Regional.  The village is predominantly one- or two-storey houses with a few small shops and cafes or bars.

Population

See also
Communes of the Martinique department

References

Communes of Martinique
Populated places in Martinique